The 2022 SMP Russian Circuit Racing Series is the ninth season of the Russian Circuit Racing Series, organized by SMP Racing. It's the eighth season with TCR class cars. In 2022, the competition's held in eight classes: Touring, Touring Light, Super Production, S1600, GT4, CN, Historic LADA Cup and Time Attack Unlimited.

Teams and drivers
Yokohama is the official tyre supplier.

Touring / TCR Russian Touring Car Championship

Super Production
All teams and drivers are Russian-registered.

Touring Light
All teams and drivers are Russian-registered.

S1600
All teams and drivers are Russian-registered.

GT4
All teams and drivers are Russian-registered.

Sports prototype CN

SMP LADA Historic Touring Cup

SMP Time Attack Unlim

Calendar and results
The first version of the schedule was announced on January 26, 2022, and included 8 events, 4 of which were to be held in a two-weekend format. On March 23, 2022, a modified schedule is presented that includes 4 events and all events scheduled to be held in Russia. The final version of the calendar is presented on April 15 and includes 5 rounds.

Championship standings

Scoring systems

Touring / TCR Russian Touring Car Championship

† – Drivers did not finish the race, but were classified as they completed over 75% of the race distance.

Touring / TCR Russian Touring Car Championship Team's Standings

{|
| valign="top" |

Super Production

† – Drivers did not finish the race, but were classified as they completed over 75% of the race distance.

Super Production Team's Standings

{|
| valign="top" |

Touring Light

† – Drivers did not finish the race, but were classified as they completed over 75% of the race distance.

Touring Light Team's Standings

{|
| valign="top" |

S1600

† – Drivers did not finish the race, but were classified as they completed over 75% of the race distance.

S1600 Team's Standings

Russian Circuit Racing Series
Russian Circuit Racing Series
Russian Circuit Racing Series